Richard Samuel Gibson (February 1889 – after 1921) was an English professional footballer who played as a winger. He made 120 appearances and scored 19 goals in all competitions for Birmingham over a ten-year career, and helped them win the championship of the Football League Second Division in 1920–21. He then moved to First Division Manchester United where he made 12 appearances without scoring; they were relegated that season.

Gibson was credited with recommending his former Sultan F.C. teammate Percy Barton to Birmingham.

References

1889 births
People from Holborn
Footballers from the London Borough of Camden
English footballers
Association football wingers
Birmingham City F.C. players
Manchester United F.C. players
English Football League players
Year of death missing
Place of death missing